The Motu Koita Assembly is the landowner representative body of the Motu and Koitabu people, established as an Assembly by an act of the Parliament of Papua New Guinea. It is the only Assembly of its kind in Papua New Guinea. The current Chair of the Motu Koita Assembly is Dadi Toka Jr. The Chair of the Motu Koita Assembly also holds the office of Deputy Governor of National Capital District.

History 
The capital city of Port Moresby was established on the traditional lands of the Motu and Koitabu people in the late 1800s. In recognition of this, the Motu Koitabu Interim Assembly was established under the National Capital District Government Act 1982. It was given powers and rights to legislate in the ten recognised Motu and Koitabu villages and exercise authority over their customary land, which lies within the Port Moresby boundaries. The Motu Koita Assembly was subsequently established under the Motu Koita Assembly Act 2007. The objectives of the Act are: to protect and strengthen the identity of the Motu Koitabu people as the original landowners of the National Capital District; to promote equal opportunity and popular participation in government by the Motu Koitabu people; to provide for the Motu Koitabu people especially the basic human needs for water, health, education, transportation, communication, accommodation and social order through economic self-reliance; and to protect the customary land and natural resources of the Motu Koitabu people.

References 

Indigenous peoples of Melanesia